The 2008 SEAT León Eurocup was the first season of the SEAT León Eurocup, a one-make racing series supporting the World Touring Car Championship. The best classified driver at each event was rewarded with a drive in a SUNRED Engineering–run SEAT León TFSI at the next round of the WTCC.

Oscar Nogués won the championship tied on 47 points with Marin Čolak, winning by having three race wins to Čolak's two.

Teams and drivers

Race calendar and results

Championship standings

References

External links
 
 Championship standings: SEAT Leon Eurocup 2008 at Driver Database (Archived 2009-07-23)

SEAT León Eurocup seasons
SEAT Leon Eurocup
SEAT Leon Eurocup